Epidermolytic ichthyosis (EI), also known as bullous epidermis ichthyosis (BEI), epidermolytic hyperkeratosis (EHK), bullous congenital ichthyosiform erythroderma (BCIE), bullous ichthyosiform erythroderma or bullous congenital ichthyosiform erythroderma Brocq, is a rare and severe form of ichthyosis that affects around 1 in 300,000 people. It is caused by a genetic mutation, and thus cannot be completely cured without some form of gene therapy.

While some research has been done into possible gene therapy treatments, the work hasn't yet been successfully developed to the stage where it can be routinely given to patients.

The condition involves the clumping of keratin filaments.

Genetics
It is possible to classify epidermolytic hyperkeratosis based upon palm and sole hyperkeratosis.

This is a dominant genetic condition caused by mutations in the genes encoding the proteins keratin 1 or keratin 10.
 Keratin 1 is associated with the variants affecting the palms and soles.
 Keratin 10 is associated with the variants in which these are unaffected.

Diagnosis
The condition can be diagnosed via exam that reveals; generalized redness; thick, generally dark, scales that tend to form parallel rows of spines or ridges, especially near large joints; the skin is fragile and blisters easily following trauma; extent of blistering and amount of scale is variable.

Treatment 

Oral retinoids have proven effective in treating this disorder. Depending on the side effects they may improve the quality of life. Examples are etretinate, acitretin, and isotretinoin.

Gene therapy

Gene therapy is really the only true therapy on the horizon for sufferers of EHK.

Over the past 10 years since the first EHK mouse model was developed, many ideas have been discussed about how best to cure EHK. Back as far as 1994 researchers were discussing new promising ideas such as topical lotions that would deliver ribozymes in a liposome cream. Ribozymes are a small piece of synthetic RNA which can digest RNA molecules. When cells make a protein from a gene on a chromosome sitting in the nucleus, the gene is first transcribed as a piece of RNA. This RNA is then translated into a protein. Ribozymes can be designed to destroy RNA molecules with specific sequences. In theory, this will stop the production of the protein encoded by the mutant alleles of the gene.

Successful gene therapy solutions have been recently achieved on mouse models by Jiang Chen M.D., a post-doctoral fellow in the laboratory of Dennis Roop, Ph.D., in the Center for Cutaneous Molecular Biology at Baylor College of Medicine. In 1998 they developed an inducible mouse model for epidermolysis hyperkeratosis which is viable, because the expression of a mutant K10 allele can be restricted to a focal area of the skin. "Once the mutant K10 allele is activated in epidermal stem cells by topical application of an inducer, these stem cells continuously give rise to defective progeny that form hyperkeratotic lesions which persist for the life of the mouse. It was observed that partial suppression of the mutant K10 gene may be sufficient to eliminate the disorder."

To test this observation, Dr. Chen and his team of researchers developed siRNAs that target the mutant K10 gene products for degradation, without affecting normal K10 gene products. Dr. Chen observed that under these conditions, an efficient knock-down of mutant, but not normal, K10 genes could be achieved. The results allowed the normal K10 genes to function properly building healthy skin tissues. He claims that these results may prove to be a very vital step forward in forging a novel gene therapy and possible permanent corrective therapy for this debilitating skin disorder.

Next steps

The challenge has always been how to deliver the siRNA using a topical method or retroviral vectors and ex vivo gene transfer. In 2011/12 a team at Northwestern University claim to have solved the topical delivery of siRNA dilemma. Personalized siRNA can be delivered in a commercial moisturizer or phosphate-buffered saline, and do not require barrier disruption or transfection agents, such as liposomes, peptides, or viruses. "Topical application of nucleic acids offers many potential therapeutic advantages for suppressing genes in the skin, and potentially for systemic gene delivery. However, the epidermal barrier typically precludes entry of gene-suppressing therapy unless the barrier is disrupted. We now show that spherical nucleic acid nanoparticle conjugates (SNA-NCs), gold cores surrounded by a dense shell of highly oriented, covalently immobilized siRNA, freely penetrate almost 100% of keratinocytes in vitro, mouse skin, and human epidermis within hours after application."
This new discovery may soon offer hope to all suffering from mono-genetic diseases such as EHK. This may lead to promising personalized, topically delivered gene therapy of cutaneous tumors, skin inflammation, and dominant negative genetic skin disorders.

UPDATE:  OCTOBER 2014
As of late, Paller reports "we are using a new nanotechnology-based technique called 'spherical nucleic acids' (SNAs) to suppress the production of the abnormal keratin 10 gene that is the most common change leading to epidermolytic ichthyosis. We continue to screen candidate SNAs to find a few that clearly suppress the abnormal keratin 10 gene much more than the normal keratin 10 gene. In the meantime, we have developed several tools towards this effort, which can also be used by other researchers. Most recently we've developed a special 'lentivirus reporter construct' in which we can see through changes in fluorescence whether or not our SNA works."

Dr. Paller and her team recently received more good news with regard to progressing their research. "We just received a grant from the National Institutes of Health (NIH) to continue this effort based on our preliminary data collected with FIRST's funding support. FIRST has been instrumental in furthering our research efforts related to ichthyosis," she said.

Maintenance

Until gene therapy solutions finally become reality, EHK sufferers must treat their fragile skin carefully. Most have learned that taking regular extended baths allows patients to care for their fragile skin and keep it manageable. Baths that include sea salt seem to improve the process of softening and removing the thickened skin.
Ointments like Petroleum Jelly, Aveeno, and other barrier type ointment help hold the moisture in the skin after a bath.

See also
 Hyperkeratosis
 Ichthyosis
 Ichthyosis bullosa of Siemens
 Isotretinoin (Accutane)
 List of cutaneous conditions
 List of cutaneous conditions caused by mutations in keratins
 List of verrucous carcinoma subtypes
 Nonbullous ichthyosiform erythroderma

References

External links 

Genodermatoses
Rare diseases
Cytoskeletal defects